Fluoride-ion batteries and fluoride shuttle batteries are batteries using the shuttle of fluoride ions (as ionic charge carrier) in the electrolyte during the discharge and charge processes. They employ the following reactions in the electrode:

Discharge process

Charge process

where M and M' are denote metals that can form metal fluorides. These battery systems contain much higher theoretical capacities, than other battery systems, because they use light-weight pure metal as electrodes.

Recently, some perovskite derivatives, as well as some even simpler metal oxides, were also proved capable of reversibly fluorination/defluorination without the collapse of their crystal structure. In principle, it is similar to the rocking-chair working pattern of lithium-ion batteries.

History 
In 2011 a modern technology for these batteries were reported with their results using solid electrolytes. A problem with their fluoride-ion battery is that they required operation at high temperature, a limitation to overcome low ionic conductivity at room temperature. In addition to the low ionic conductivity at room temperature, the capacity and the cyclability of the battery system were too low to use it in industries. In 2017, a liquid electrolyte based on glyme (glycol ethers) for the battery was reported and showed its abilities as a rechargeable battery at room temperature. The battery system was named as "Fluoride shuttle battery". The liquid electrolytes showed the performances in a rechargeable battery with cyclabilities. Further, the battery performances were improved by the modifications of the compositions of the electrolyte and the electrode. After the achievements, the researches about these batteries were obviously activated. In 2018, another team of researchers also reported a room-temperature battery using liquid electrolyte. In 2020, although the results of the battery test were not still shown, it was announced that it will be researching a battery for electric vehicles that would offer a seven times higher energy density compared to commercial lithium-ion batteries of the time.

References

Battery types